The UEFA Women's Euro 2017 final was a football match to determine the winner of UEFA Women's Euro 2017. The match took place on 6 August 2017 at De Grolsch Veste in Enschede, Netherlands, and was contested by the winners of the semi-finals, the Netherlands and Denmark.

The Netherlands won the final 4–2 for their first UEFA Women's Championship title.

Background
Both the Netherlands and Denmark reached the UEFA Women's Championship final for the first time in their histories. For the first time since 1993, a country other than Germany won the competition. Apart from Germany, only two other countries have won the championship: Norway and Sweden. Norway was defeated by both the Netherlands and Denmark in the preliminary round whereas Sweden was defeated by the Netherlands in the quarter-finals.

The finalists met each other in the group stage of the tournament, with the Netherlands winning 1–0 via a penalty from Sherida Spitse.

Route to the final

Match

Details

Statistics

References

External links

Final
2017
Netherlands women's national football team matches
Denmark women's national football team matches
August 2017 sports events in Europe
Denmark–Netherlands relations
Football in the Netherlands